Colonial Place is a small, middle-class neighborhood in the West End of Richmond, Virginia.

References

External links 
 Boundaries of Colonial Place

Neighborhoods in Richmond, Virginia